The Nevada Gaming Control Board, also known as the State Gaming Control Board, is a Nevada state governmental agency involved in the regulation of gaming and law enforcement of Nevada gaming laws throughout the state, along with the Nevada Gaming Commission. The Nevada Gaming Control Board's Enforcement Division is the law enforcement arm of the Nevada Gaming Commission. It was founded in 1955 by the Nevada Legislature.

The board is composed of three members appointed by the governor. Board members serve four-year terms in a full-time capacity.

Divisions 
Administration Division
Audit Division
Enforcement Division (staffed by sworn law enforcement officers)
Investigations Division
Tax and License Division
Technology Division

Gaming revenues and collections 
The control board reports monthly gaming revenues and collections by established areas:
Clark County
LV Strip
Downtown
North Las Vegas
Laughlin
Boulder Strip
Mesquite
Balance of County
Washoe County
Reno
Sparks
North Lake Tahoe
Balance of County
South Lake Tahoe
Elko County
Wendover
Balance of County
Carson Valley Area
Other
According to data released by the State Committee for Game Control on Tuesday, casino revenue  in Nevada showed monthly growth for the first time in 2019. Over 1.04 billion was collected from players across the state in June, up 11.6 percent from a year ago.

See also 

 List of law enforcement agencies in Nevada

References

External links
Nevada Gaming Control Board

Gambling regulators in the United States
Gaming Control Board
Gambling in Nevada